Henri Paul Cartan (8 July 1904 – 13 August 2008) was a French mathematician who made substantial contributions to algebraic topology.

He was the son of the mathematician Élie Cartan, nephew of mathematician Anna Cartan, oldest brother of composer , physicist  and mathematician , and the son-in-law of physicist Pierre Weiss.

Life
According to his own words, Henri Cartan was interested in mathematics at a very young age, without being influenced by his family. He moved to Paris with his family after his father's appointment at Sorbonne in 1909 and he attended secondary school at Lycée Hoche in Versailles.

In 1923 he started studying mathematics at École Normale Supérieure, receiving an agrégation in 1926 and a doctorate in 1928. His PhD thesis, entitled Sur les systèmes de fonctions holomorphes a variétés linéaires lacunaires et leurs applications, was supervised by Paul Montel.

Cartan taught at Lycée Malherbe in Caen from 1928 to 1929, at University of Lille from 1929 to 1931 and at University of Strasbourg from 1931 to 1939. After German invasion of France the university staff was moved to Clermont Ferrand, but in 1940 he returned to Paris to work at Université de Paris and École Normale Supérieure. From 1969 until his retirement in 1975 he was professor at Paris-Sud University.

Cartan died on 13 August 2008 at the age of 104. His funeral took place the following Wednesday on 20 August in Die, Drome.

Honours and awards
In 1932 Cartan was invited to give a Cours Peccot at the Collège de France. In 1950 he was elected president of the Société mathématique de France and from 1967 to 1970 he was president of the International Mathematics Union. He was awarded the Émile Picard Medal in 1959, the CNRS Gold Medal in 1976, and the Wolf Prize in 1980.

He was an invited Speaker at the International Congress of Mathematics in 1932 in Zürich and a Plenary Speaker at the ICM in 1950 in Cambridge, Massachusetts and in 1958 in Edinburgh.

From 1974 until his death he had been a member of the French Academy of Sciences. He was elected a foreign member of many academies and societies, including the American Academy of Arts and Sciences (1950), London Mathematical Society (1959), Royal Danish Academy of Sciences and Letters (1962),  (1967), Royal Society of London (1971), Göttingen Academy of Sciences and Humanities (1971), Spanish Royal Academy of Sciences (1971), United States National Academy of Sciences (1972), Bavarian Academy of Science (1974), Royal Academy of Belgium (1978), Japan Academy (1979), Finnish Academy of Science and Letters (1979), Royal Swedish Academy of Sciences (1981), Polish Academy of Sciences (1985) and Russian Academy of Sciences (1999).

He was awarded Honorary Doctorates from Münster (1952), ETH Zürich (1955), Oslo (1961), Sussex (1969), Cambridge (1969), Stockholm (1978), Oxford University (1980), Zaragoza (1985) and Athens (1992).

The French government named him Commandeur des Palmes Académiques in 1964, Officier de la Légion d'honneur in 1965 and Commandeur de l'Ordre du Mérite in 1971.

Political and social activities 
During the 70's and the 80's Cartan used his influence to help obtain the release of several dissident mathematicians, including Leonid Plyushch and Anatoly Shcharansky, imprisoned by the Soviet Union, Jose Luis Massera, imprisoned between 1975 and 1984 by the Uruguayan dictatorship, and Sion Assidon, imprisoned during the Moroccan Years of Lead. For his humanitarian efforts, he received in 1989 the Heinz R. Pagels Human Rights of Scientists Award from the New York Academy of Sciences.

Since the 30's Cartan had tied collaborations with many German mathematicians, including Heinrich Behnke and Peter Thullen. Right after World War II he put many efforts to improve the cooperation between French and German mathematicians and restore the flow of exchanges of ideas and students.

Cartan supported the idea of European Federalism and from 1974 to 1985 was president of the French section of the Union of European Federalists. At the 1984 European elections he was the leader of the Liste pour les États-Unis d'Europe, which obtained 0.4% of votes and did not elect any candidate.

In 1992 he gave a speech at the first European Congress of Mathematics in Paris, remarking the common heritage and future of European countries and praising the first reunion between mathematicians from the two previously separated parts of Europe.

Research 
Cartan has worked in several fields across algebra, geometry and analysis, focussing primarily on algebraic topology and homological algebra.

He was a founding member of the Bourbaki group in 1934 and one of its most active participants. After 1945 he started his own seminar in Paris, which deeply influenced Jean-Pierre Serre, Armand Borel, Alexander Grothendieck and Frank Adams, amongst others of the leading lights of the younger generation. The number of his official students was small, but includes Joséphine Guidy Wandja (the first African woman to gain a PhD in mathematics), Adrien Douady, Roger Godement, Max Karoubi, Jean-Louis Koszul, Jean-Pierre Serre and René Thom.

Cartan's first research interests, until the 40's, were in the theory of functions of several complex variables, which later gave rise to the theory of complex varieties and analytic geometry. Motivated by the solution to the Cousin problems, he worked on sheaf cohomology and coherent sheaves and proved two powerful results, Cartan's theorems A and B.

Since the 50's he became more interested in algebraic topology. Among his major contributions, he worked on cohomology operations and homology of the Eilenberg–MacLane spaces, he introduced the notion of Steenrod algebra, and, together with Jean-Pierre Serre, developed the method of "killing homotopy groups". His 1956 book with Samuel Eilenberg on homological algebra was an important text, treating the subject with a moderate level of abstraction with the help of category theory. They introduced fundamental concepts, including those of projective module, weak dimension, and what is now called the Cartan–Eilenberg resolution.

Among his other contributions, in general topology he introduced the notions of filter and ultrafilter and in potential theory he developed the fine topology and proved Cartan's lemma. The Cartan model for equivariant cohomology is also named after him.

Selected publications

 

 Espaces fibrés et homotopie, (Séminaire Henri Cartan Tome 2 (1949–1950))
 Cohomologie des groupes, suite spectrale, faisceaux, (Séminaire Henri Cartan Tome 3 (1950–1951))
 Algèbres d'Eilenberg – Mac Lane et homotopie, (Séminaire Henri Cartan Tome 7 no2. (1954–1955))
 Fonctions automorphes,(Séminaire Henri Cartan Tome 10 no2. (1957–1958))
 Quelques questions de topologie, 1958.
 Homological Algebra (with S. Eilenberg), Princeton Univ Press, 1956 
 Séminaires de l'École normale supérieure (called "Séminaires Cartan"), Secr. Math. IHP, 1948-1964; New York, W.A.Benjamin ed., 1967.
 Théorie élémentaire des fonctions analytiques, Paris, Hermann, 1961 (translated into English, German, Japanese, Spanish and Russian).
 Calcul différentiel, Paris, Hermann, 1967 (translated into English, Spanish and Russian).
 Formes différentielles, Paris, Hermann, 1967 (translated into English, Spanish and Russian).
 Differential Forms, Dover 2006
 Œuvres — Collected Works, 3 vols., ed. Reinhold Remmert & Jean-Pierre Serre, Springer Verlag, Heidelberg, 1967.

 Relations d'ordre en théorie des permutations des ensembles finis, Neuchâtel, 1973. 
 Théorie élémentaire des fonctions analytiques d'une ou plusieurs variables complexes, Paris, Hermann, 1975. 
 
 Cours de calcul différentiel, Paris, Hermann, 1977.
.

Notes

External links

 
 Illusie, Luc; Cartier, Pierre (ed.), Dossier. Notices of the American Mathematical Society, Sept. 2010, 
 Biographical sketch and bibliography by the Société Mathématique de France on the occasion of Cartan's 100th birthday. 
 
 
  (translations of above two articles from the SMF Gazette)
 Papers by Henri Cartan as member of the 'Association européenne des enseignants' (AEDE) and the 'Mouvement fédéraliste européen' (MFE) are at the Historical Archives of the EU in Florence

1904 births
2008 deaths
French centenarians
Men centenarians
20th-century French mathematicians
21st-century French mathematicians
Nicolas Bourbaki
Topologists
Complex analysts
Mathematical analysts
Academic staff of the Lille University of Science and Technology
Academic staff of the University of Strasbourg
Academic staff of the University of Paris
Wolf Prize in Mathematics laureates
Institute for Advanced Study visiting scholars
École Normale Supérieure alumni
Lycée Hoche alumni
Members of the French Academy of Sciences
American Academy of Arts and Sciences
London Mathematical Society
Members of the Royal Danish Academy of Sciences and Letters
Foreign Members of the Royal Society
Foreign associates of the National Academy of Sciences
Members of the Finnish Academy of Science and Letters
Members of the Royal Swedish Academy of Sciences
Members of the Polish Academy of Sciences
Foreign Members of the Russian Academy of Sciences
Presidents of the International Mathematical Union